Harry Eagle (July 13, 1905 – June 21, 1992) was an American physician and pathologist. He was born in New York City then studied, and later worked, at Johns Hopkins University before moving on to the National Institutes of Health. From 1961 to 1988 he worked at the Albert Einstein College of Medicine. He is best known for Eagle's minimal essential medium, which is important in understanding how human and mammalian cells reproduce. He is also known for the Eagle effect. In 1936 he was the inaugural winner of the Eli Lilly and Company-Elanco Research Award. In 1973, he was a co-winner of the Louisa Gross Horwitz Prize of Columbia University. In 1987, he was awarded the National Medal of Science for his work in the Biological Sciences.

Articles 
J. E. Darnell, L. Levintow, M. D. Scharff: Harry Eagle. J Cellular Physiology (1970) 76,3: S. 241-252 
A. Gilman: Presentation of the Academy Medal to Harry Eagle, M. D. Bull N Y Acad Med. (1970) 46(9): S. 666-669

References

American pathologists
Johns Hopkins University alumni
Johns Hopkins University faculty
Yeshiva University faculty
1905 births
1992 deaths
National Medal of Science laureates
20th-century American physicians
Albert Einstein College of Medicine faculty